Waterhouseite, Mn7(PO4)2(OH)8, is a hydroxy manganese phosphate mineral. It is a medium-soft, brittle mineral occurring in pseudo-orthorhombic monoclinic bladed crystals and orange-brown to dark brown in color. Waterhouseite is on the softer side with a Mohs hardness of 4, has a specific gravity of 3.5 and a yellowish-brown streak. It is named after Frederick George Waterhouse, first director of  the South Australian Museum, as well as recognizes the work Waterhouse Club has done in support of the South Australian Museum.

Occurrence 
Waterhouseite occurs in divergent sprays of bladed crystals up to 1mm in length and 20 micrometers in thickness.

It is found in South Australia, specifically in the Iron Monarch mine, Iron Knob, Middleback Range, Eyre Peninsula, South Australia. 

Waterhouseite is generally found in a carbonate rich cavities with other minerals such as gatehouseite, seamanite, rhodochrosite, shigaite, baryte, hausmannite and hematite.

Crystal structure
Waterhouseite has a unique asymmetrical structure consisting of a dense, complex framework of Mn(O, OH)6 octahedra and PO4 tetrahedra which are linked by both edges and corners.  It is highly unusual for the PO4 tetrahedron to share two of its edges with the Mn(O, OH)6 octahedral. There are only two other known arsenates that have the same edge sharing as waterhouseite.

See also
 Classification of minerals
 List of minerals

References

External links
 http://rruff.info/doclib/cm/vol43/CM43_1401.pdf 

Manganese(II) minerals
Phosphate minerals
Hydroxide minerals
Monoclinic minerals
Minerals in space group 14